Tokiwa Dam  is a gravity dam located in Hokkaido Prefecture in Japan. The dam is used for water supply. The catchment area of the dam is 23 km2. The dam impounds about 9  ha of land when full and can store 500 thousand cubic meters of water. The construction of the dam was started on 1969 and completed in 1971.

References

Dams in Hokkaido